Matt Louis Urban (August 25, 1919 – March 4, 1995) was a United States Army lieutenant colonel and one of the most decorated American soldiers of World War II. Urban performed valiantly in combat on many occasions despite being wounded in action several times. He received over a dozen personal decorations for combat from the U.S. Army, including seven Purple Hearts. In 1980, he received the Medal of Honor and three other U.S. decorations and one foreign decoration for his actions in France and Belgium in 1944.

Early years 
Matt Urban was born Matthew Louis Urbanowicz in Buffalo, New York. His father Stanley was a Polish immigrant and a plumbing contractor. His mother Helen was born in Depew, New York. Urban was baptized at Corpus Christi Church and lived at 1153 Broadway while growing up. He attended East High School in Buffalo, and graduated in 1937. He had three brothers: Doctor Stanley (Urbanowicz) Urban, Arthur (Urbanowicz) Urban, and Eugene, who died in 1927 from appendicitis.

In the fall of 1937, Urban enrolled at Cornell University in Ithaca, New York. He majored in history and government with a minor in community recreation. He graduated on June 14, 1941, with a Bachelor of Arts degree; during his last year, he used the name Matty L. Urbanowitz. While at Cornell University, he was a member of the Reserve Officers Training Corps (ROTC), the track and boxing teams, and the Kappa Delta Rho fraternity.

Military service 
The U.S. Army service records for Urban use both "Matt Urban" and "Matty Louis (L.) Urbanowitz". The name "Matt Louis Urban" was engraved on the front of his original white Arlington National Cemetery headstone. His current and private grave monument at Arlington National Cemetery uses the name "Matt L. Urban".

Urban was commissioned a second lieutenant of infantry in the U.S. Army on May 22, 1941, and entered active duty on July 2, 1941, at Fort Bragg, North Carolina. He first assignment was as a platoon leader of D Company, 2nd Battalion, 60th Infantry Regiment, 9th Infantry Division. While at Fort Bragg, he founded the newsletter for the 60th Infantry.

World War II 
Urban served as a first lieutenant and captain in six campaigns during World War II, and was severely wounded his seventh time while charging an enemy machine gun position on 3 September 1944, in Belgium. He was promoted to first lieutenant on February 1, 1942, captain on April 30, 1943, major on October 2, 1944, and lieutenant colonel on October 2, 1945. He was medically retired from the U.S. Army on February 26, 1946.

Beginning at Fort Bragg, Urban served as a platoon leader. During the war he was a morale/special services officer, a platoon leader, a company executive officer and company commander, and a battalion executive officer and battalion commander of the 60th Infantry Regiment, 9th Infantry Division ("Old Reliables").

North Africa 
Urban first went into combat when he made the beach landing under fire with another soldier on a raft on November 8, 1942, the first day of the invasion of North Africa, of the North Africa Campaign. Along with a Purple Heart, one of the first medals he received during the war was a Silver Star.

While serving with the Second Battalion, 60th Infantry, he was wounded in action seven times. A member of his unit, Sergeant Earl G. Evans, wrote "the major, only a lieutenant at the time, was wounded in Maknassy, Tunisia and refused to be evacuated. He followed up this refusal by taking out a combat patrol. At another time in Tunisia, our battalion successfully halted a German counterattack, and it was through the major's efforts that we succeeded. As our outfit was falling back, the major held his ground and grabbed the closest German. He killed him with a trench knife, took the German's machine pistol, and fired at the onrushing enemy." During the German counterattack Urban was wounded by grenade shrapnel.

Sicily 
German planes raided the harbor and the Orizaba was also attacked by German planes in the early morning of August 1 before Urban's unit disembarked from the ship that day. Urban, on deck at the time, replaced an anti-aircraft gunnery crew's spotter who was machine-gunned by a German Stuka dive bomber. Using the badly wounded spotter's binoculars, Urban spotted the plane returning and the gun crew was able to shoot it down.

After the invasion of Sicily, the Germans were entrenched in a fortified mountain stronghold where the 1st Infantry Division got bogged down by the difficult terrain. The 60th Infantry and 4th Tabor of Goumiers were given the mission of crossing the mountains in central Sicily undetected to flank the Germans. Urban's company and battalion successfully spearheaded 4,000 men with pack-mules single file by night, which caught the Germans off guard and caused them to retreat from Troina to the next line of defense at Randazzo.

A battle would have cost hundreds of American lives. Sicily was liberated on August 20. On September 5, Urban was presented a Silver Star in Sicily, before the 9th Infantry Division was sent back to England on November 8 for a rest and to re-equip and train for the Invasion of Normandy.

France 
Urban and the 2nd Battalion, 60th Infantry landed on Utah Beach on June 11, 1944. On June 14, Urban's company attacked German positions near Renouf, France. As F Company was hit by heavy enemy small arms and tank fire, Urban picked up a bazooka after the bazooka gunner was shot, and persuaded the gunner's ammo carrier to accompany him through the hedgerows to a point near the oncoming tanks. Exposing himself to the enemy, he knocked out two German tanks, and the company moved forward and routed the enemy. Later that day, while advancing near Orglandes, Urban was struck in the left leg by shrapnel by direct fire from a German tank who spotted and aimed towards him before he could fire the bazooka. Urban refused to be evacuated after a medic attended him, and continued directing his company from position to position while being carried by his men sitting down on a stretcher.

The next day, he was wounded in the right forearm and attended in the field by the 2nd Battalion doctor, who had him evacuated to a field hospital surgical tent where Urban underwent surgery on his left calf by two doctors using lanterns for light. Urban was then shipped to England for further treatment on a troop carrier. While Urban was recovering at a hospital in England in July 1944, he learned from casualties from his battalion that they had been taking severe losses in the hedgerows of France, and were lacking experienced combat officers. In order to go back to his men instead of being sent back to the United States because of his leg injury, he took charge of training forty soldiers near the hospital who were soon being sent to Normandy. He left with them on a troop carrier.

On July 25, after arriving and dropping the soldiers off for combat duty on Normandy in the morning, he began hitchhiking his way from Utah Beach to his company and battalion near Saint-Lô, France, as the breakout from Normandy (July 25–31, 1944) was about to commence, with the 9th Division in the lead. Urban, limping and using a stick he made as a cane, reached the 2nd Battalion to find that the unit was checked by strong enemy opposition after their attack began. German machine guns and an anti-tank gun had them pinned down. He then got men moving again so they would not be killed in their foxholes and ditches.

He helped a soldier pull a wounded and pinned-down Sherman tank driver out of his burning tank before it exploded. He located another American support tank which was still operable, but its gun was not manageable and its turret gunner had been wounded. The tank was stalled because of crossfire from a German machinegun and an anti-tank gun positioned on top of a hill which had destroyed another tank.

Urban was told by a tank platoon lieutenant that the driver was still inside the tank. The lieutenant and then a tank platoon sergeant were both machine-gunned and killed while attempting to get to the tank's turret and its 50-caliber machine gun. Urban crawled alongside the tank and was able to get to and man the tank turret under fire. He ordered the tank driver to advance in high gear, and as the tank jumped off, he fired on the German machine gun emplacement. The anti-tank gun also started firing at Urban, but was not able to hit him or disable his tank. The 2nd Battalion rallied behind Urban and advanced into the valley in a unified assault.

Urban destroyed more machinegun positions and the 2nd Battalion overran the Germans lines with hand-to-hand and bayonet fighting causing many German soldiers to surrender. The 2nd Battalion commander, Max L. Wolf, witnessed the action from his command post on another hill with his binoculars and recommended Urban for the Medal of Honor for spearheading the 2nd Battalion's Saint-Lô breakthrough and saving many lives. Urban was then made the executive officer of the battalion.

Staff Sergeant Evans, who was assigned to the 2nd Battalion command post on July 25, 1944, wrote up Urban's recommendation for Wolf. On July 5, 1945, Evans wrote The Pentagon about Urban actions after Evans was released from a German prisoner-of-war camp, saying in part: "Urban move forward, and damned if the U.S. Army didn't move forward also. He bellied up to the tank and amid heavy gunfire scrambled aboard and manned the machine gun. The driver took heart with Urban aboard. The tank roared forward, and Urban tore the hillside apart with that gun. The men, once again with 'Urban-itis' scrambled up the rise and gained the objective."

On August 2, Urban was wounded in the chest by a shell fragment that narrowly missed his heart. He again refused to be evacuated to a hospital. On August 6, Wolf was killed in action near Cherbourg, France, and Urban, only 24 years old, assumed command of the battalion. Urban was wounded again by shrapnel on August 15, but remained with his unit. The 60th Infantry was awarded the French Croix de Guerre with palm for the period of June 11–18, 1944.

Belgium 

On September 2, 1944, the 2nd Battalion was assigned to a regiment of another infantry division. After Urban and his battalion dug in one mile from Philippeville, Belgium, Urban met with the division's commanding officer, a brigadier general, who ordered Urban and his 2nd Battalion to attack Philippeville the next morning.

Urban and two others scouted the village and found at least a regiment-sized German force there which was well defended with machine guns, tanks, and antiaircraft guns aimed down the one road leading to the village. On September 3, Urban and his battalion attacked Philippeville after getting the artillery cover he requested from the general. While charging at a forward enemy machinegun emplacement with two grenades, he was shot through the neck, permanently disabling his larynx.

One of Urban's men got to him and immediately plugged and bandaged his two neck wounds. Another soldier arrived and both soldiers dragged Urban one hundred yards to a muddy ditch while under fire from another German machinegun as the battle raged. The 2nd Battalion doctor and chaplain arrived. The doctor gave Urban plasma and performed a tracheotomy on him. The chaplain gave Urban last rites after the doctor nodded to him that Urban would not live. On September 4, Urban was carried off the battlefield to a field hospital tent.

Urban spent a few weeks in a field hospital in France before being sent back to England for further recovery. On October 2, 1944, he was promoted to major. The 9th Infantry Division was awarded a Belgian Unit Citation for meritorious service during the period September 3–13, 1944.

Germany 
While getting a pass to Scotland in December, he returned instead to the 2nd Battalion, 60th Infantry, which was at Camp Elsenborn, Germany. Urban was welcomed by his men, who thought he had been killed in action. Although Urban could not speak, he requested a combat assignment in writing. His request was denied for medical concerns by the 60th Infantry Regiment commander at Elsenborn. He was allowed to stay with the 2nd Battalion until the battalion pulled out of Elsenborn, and he returned to England.

Beginning in October 1945, he was a staff writer and later an editor for Liberty Magazines Veterans' View Bulletin until October 1947; he was medically retired from the U.S. Army in February 1946. During this time he was promoted to lieutenant colonel and changed his legal name from Matty Urbanowitz to Matt Urban.

Later years 
In 1949, he became the Recreation Director in Port Huron, Michigan. Starting in 1956, he took a job as Director of the Monroe, Michigan, Community Center until 1972. After leaving the job, he continued to serve the community center as coach for basketball, baseball, and football programs. At Monroe, he also trained several young men who became national Golden Gloves Champions. He was appointed chair of the Michigan Olympic Boxing Committee. Later, as part of the Chicago Olympic Committee, he was one of three trainers who accompanied Muhammad Ali, at that time still known as Cassius Clay, to the San Francisco Olympic tryouts.

After Monroe, he became the Director of the Recreation Department for Holland, Michigan from 1972 to 1989. He organized a camp for underprivileged children and became its Camp Director, served as Boys Club director, and a Cub Scout Cubmaster. He was also involved in other activities and organizations like the Red Cross, the Amateur Softball Association, and Boy Scouts, as chairman, board member, and committee member. He was inducted into the Hall of Honor at the Softball Hall of Fame.

In 1989, Urban retired and self-published an autobiography, The Matt Urban Story, Life And World War II Experiences. In 1990, the book was retitled as The Hero-We Nearly Forgot, The Matt Urban Story.

Medal of Honor 

In early 1979, a Michigan Disabled American Veterans (DAV) regional service representative who had come to know Urban personally over a long period of time, sent an official Medal of Honor recommendation inquiry to U.S. Army Headquarters. The misplaced MOH recommendation for Urban was found and revealed that Major Max L. Wolf, Urban's battalion commander in France, had initiated a Medal of Honor recommendation for Urban which was forwarded by Staff Sergeant Earl Evans just prior to Wolf being killed in action in France on August 6, 1944. The U.S. Army then completed the necessary recommendation process to award Urban the Medal of Honor. In 1980, by the direction of the President, the Department of the Army awarded Matt Urban the Medal of Honor, in the name of the Congress.

On July 10, 1980, Urban was notified by the White House that he was a Medal of Honor recipient, and the next day he was notified that the Medal of Honor award ceremony would be on July 19. On July 18, Urban was presented the Legion of Merit, Bronze Star Medal with "V" device (second oak leaf cluster), and his seventh Purple Heart (sixth oak leaf cluster), by Army Chief of Staff, Edward C. Meyer, during a ceremony at the Pentagon. At a ceremony at the French Embassy, he was also presented the Croix de guerre with Bronze Star by Francois Lefebvre de Labouaye, the French Ambassador to the United States. The citation for the medal which was not personally awarded to Urban before this occasion was signed by General Charles de Gaulle in June 1944. On July 19, President Jimmy Carter presented Urban the Medal of Honor in front of several hundred guests, which included fellow 9th Infantry Division veterans who had served with Urban in combat.

Death 

Urban died on March 4, 1995, in Holland, Michigan, at the age of 75. The cause of death was a collapsed lung, reportedly due to his war injuries. He is buried  at Arlington National Cemetery in Arlington, Virginia.

Medal of Honor citation 
Urban's Medal of Honor citation reads:

Rank and organization: Lieutenant Colonel (then captain), 2nd Battalion, 60th Infantry Regiment, 9th Infantry Division
Place and date: Renouf, France, 14 July to 3 September 1944
Entered service at: Fort Bragg, North Carolina, 2 July 1941
Date and place of birth: 25 August 1919, Buffalo, New York

G.O. No.: 10, 18 September 1980

Military awards 
Urban's military awards include fourteen individual decorations for combat he received from the U.S. Army: the Medal of Honor, two Silver Stars, the Legion of Merit, three Bronze Star Medals (two for heroism), and seven Purple Hearts. Urban received the following military decorations and awards:

Personal awards and honors
Urban's personal awards and honors include:
 Man of the Year Award (1953), Monroe, Michigan
 New York State Conspicuous Service Cross (1979)
 Matt Urban Day (1979), Holland, Michigan
 Amateur Softball Association of America, National Softball Hall of Fame (Commissioner), 1980 
 Matt Urban Sports Complex (1996), Holland, Michigan
 Matt Urban Center (2000), Buffalo, New York
 Matt Urban American Legion Post 40, Monroe, Michigan
 Lt. Col. Matt Urban Memorial (2008), Buffalo, New York
 Lt. Col. Matt Urban VFW Post 7275 (2011), Lancaster, New York
 Lt. Col. Matt Urban Polish Legion of American Veterans (PLAV) Post 164, Warren, Ohio
 National Veteran Boxers Association, Buffalo Boxing Hall of Fame (2012) 
 Matt Urban Memorial Bridge, US 24, was named after Urban in 2014, in Monroe County, Michigan
 Kappa Delta Rho fraternity, Ordo Honoris - Beta Chapter, Cornell University
 The Headquarters, 2nd Battalion, 60th Infantry, building at Fort Jackson, South Carolina was named "Urban Hall" in March 2017

See also 
 List of Medal of Honor recipients for World War II

Notes

References

External links 
 
 
 
 
 
 

1919 births
1995 deaths
United States Army personnel of World War II
American people of Polish descent
Burials at Arlington National Cemetery
Cornell University alumni
Military personnel from Buffalo, New York
Recipients of the Croix de Guerre 1939–1945 (France)
Recipients of the Legion of Merit
Recipients of the Silver Star
United States Army Medal of Honor recipients
United States Army officers
Battle of Normandy recipients of the Medal of Honor
World War II recipients of the Medal of Honor